Andrés Nicolás D'Alessandro (born 15 April 1981) is an Argentine former professional footballer who played as an attacking midfielder.

He has played top-flight football in Argentina, Germany, England, Spain, Brazil and Uruguay. He won an Olympic gold medal with Argentina in 2004 and also played at that year's Copa América.

In 2020, he was awarded Brazilian citizenship.

Club career

Early career
D'Alessandro was born in the La Paternal section of Buenos Aires, Argentina. He joined the labor force as a pizza delivery boy before becoming a professional footballer. Known as El Cabezón ("The Big Headed") for how large his big head looks on his small frame rather than any ego connotations, he emerged through the River Plate youth system that has produced much of Argentina's top talent over the years. He followed the likes of Santiago Solari and Pablo Aimar through the ranks, together with Javier Saviola, with whom he shared the limelight in the 2001 Youth World Championship. With the River Plate senior team, he won the 2001–02 and 2002–03 Primera División titles.

Spell in Europe
D'Alessandro attracted attention from European clubs following his success and performances at the 2001 FIFA World Youth Championship. He eventually transferred to Wolfsburg in July 2003 for a club record €9 million. On 21 September 2005, D'Alessandro scored the Bundesliga's 40,000th goal since its creation in 1963, netting the fourth goal in a 4–2 victory over Hannover 96.

On 31 January 2006, to the surprise of most fans, D'Alessandro joined English Premier League club Portsmouth on loan for the remainder of the season. His main objective with his new club was to blend in with new teammates and help his club to avoid relegation. On Easter Monday, 17 April, he scored his first goal in English football – a contender for goal of the season – in Portsmouth's 2–1 defeat away to Charlton Athletic.

Portsmouth survived and manager Harry Redknapp sought to sign D'Alessandro on a permanent basis. But he was attracting the attention of many European clubs with strong interest from the likes of Atlético Madrid and Benfica. On 17 June he ended the speculation regarding his career by completing a season-long loan switch to La Liga outfit Real Zaragoza, citing his desire to play in Spain as a major factor in his decision. On 6 June 2007, he signed a contract at Zaragoza, keeping him at the club until 2011.

Return to South America
In 2008, he joined his former River Plate manager Ramón Díaz at Argentine club San Lorenzo. However, after Díaz left the club, D'Alesandro opted to move to Brazil to play for Internacional. Playing for the former Copa Libertadores champions, he described as a "step forward" in his career.

On 13 December 2008 it was reported on ESPN Deportes that the Los Angeles Galaxy had made a $10 million offer to Internacional for D'Alesandro but was declined. Their vice president Fernando Carvalho was quoted; "The offer came from the Los Angeles Galaxy of the United States. I didn't even want to listen to the details. The offer was for more money than we paid for D'Alessandro, who arrived here for five million euro, but we want to keep the Argentinian." D'Alessandro has become one of Internacional's most idolized players of all time along the likes of Falcão, Valdomiro, and Fernandão. In 2008, he was part of Inter's Sulamericana Championship. In 2009 Internacional finished in second place in both the Brasileirão and Copa do Brasil. In 2010, D'Alessandro led Internacional to their second Libertadores Championship, and was elected the best player in South America for that year; in the 2010 FIFA Club World Cup, he also helped Internacional to a third-place finish, and was awarded the Bronze Ball as the tournament's third best player. In 2011 D'Alessadro had personally an even better year, but Internacional only managed to win the State Gaucho Championship. 2012 was a bad year for both Internacional and D'Alessandro. Furthermore, rumours of him leaving to play in China caused a major distraction; after long drawn out drama he stayed but soon was injured. In 2013 his game improved again, and while Inter only won the State Championship, he was praised as the only positive factor of the team that year. 2014 started well; D'Alessandro continued to play well and led Inter to their 4th straight Gaucho Championship.

On 3 February 2016, he returned to River Plate after  years on a loan deal. He won his second Recopa Sudamericana and the Copa Argentina during his stay at the club. After that, he returned to Internacional de Porto Alegre on Dec 2016, and his successful career continues in this latter.

International career
D'Alessandro won the 2001 Under-20 World Championship with the Argentine youth side, held in Buenos Aires; due to his performances alongside his club teammate Javier Saviola, he was awarded the Silver Ball as the tournament's second best player. D'Alessandro had originally started the tournament as a substitute, but injuries in the team allowed him a place in the team during the later games. José Pekkermann give him the key to lead the Argentinian attack and the accounting with Javier Pedro Saviola Who Was great technical and mobility skills helps Argentina to won the title after beating Ghana 3–0 in the final. He has represented Argentina's senior side on 28 occasions, scoring 4 times between 2001 and 2011. He also represented Argentina's under-23 side at the 2004 Olympic Games in Athens, where Argentina won a gold medal.

D'Alessandro also took part in the 2004 Copa América with Argentina. He scored his only goal of the tournament in the group stage, in Argentina's 6–1 victory over Ecuador In the final, against rivals Brazil, he missed Argentina's first penalty in the resulting shootout, following a 2–2 draw after extra time; Argentina were defeated 4–2 in the shootout.

On 20 August 2010, Argentine coach Sergio Batista recalled D'Alessandro to the national team for a friendly against Spain, which was played on 7 September 2010 at the Monumental Stadium River Plate.

Style of play
A talented attacking midfielder, D'Alessandro is best known for his dribbling ability, creativity, and technical skill, and is capable beating players with body feints and tricks, such as the dragback (boba), nutmeg, or the Blomqvist shuffle; he is also an accurate free-kick taker. D'Alessandro is also known for his short passing ability, which makes him a capable assist provider.

In 2001, he was named one of the 100 best young footballers in the world by Don Balón, and he was also labelled one of Maradona's potential heirs by the media and by Maradona himself; despite his precocious talent however, he was not able to fully fulfill the potential he demonstrated in his youth.

Career statistics

Club

International

Honours

Club
River Plate
Argentine Primera División: 2000 Clausura, 2002 Clausura, 2003 Clausura
Recopa Sudamericana: 2016
Copa Argentina: 2015–16

Internacional
Copa Sudamericana: 2008
Campeonato Gaúcho: 2009, 2011, 2012, 2013, 2014, 2015
Copa Libertadores: 2010
Recopa Sudamericana: 2011

International
Argentina U20
FIFA World Youth Championship: 2001

Argentina Olympic
Summer Olympics Gold Medal:  2004

Individual
South American Team of the Year: 2001, 2002, 2008, 2010
FIFA World Youth Championship Silver Ball: 2001
FIFA Club World Cup Bronze Ball: 2010
South American Footballer of the Year: 2010
EFE Brazil Trophy: 2013

References

External links

 
 
 
 

1981 births
Living people
Footballers from Buenos Aires
Argentine footballers
Argentina under-20 international footballers
Argentina international footballers
2004 Copa América players
Olympic footballers of Argentina
Association football forwards
Club Atlético River Plate footballers
VfL Wolfsburg players
Portsmouth F.C. players
Premier League players
Footballers at the 2004 Summer Olympics
La Liga players
Real Zaragoza players
San Lorenzo de Almagro footballers
Sport Club Internacional players
Club Nacional de Football players
Olympic gold medalists for Argentina
Campeonato Brasileiro Série A players
Bundesliga players
Argentine Primera División players
Uruguayan Primera División players
Copa Libertadores-winning players
Expatriate footballers in Brazil
Expatriate footballers in Germany
Expatriate footballers in Spain
Expatriate footballers in England
Argentine expatriate footballers
Argentine expatriate sportspeople in Brazil
Argentine expatriate sportspeople in Germany
Argentine expatriate sportspeople in Spain
Argentine expatriate sportspeople in England
Argentine expatriate sportspeople in Uruguay
South American Footballer of the Year winners
Olympic medalists in football
Medalists at the 2004 Summer Olympics
Argentine people of Italian descent
Naturalized citizens of Brazil